Martin Mapisa (born 25 May 1998) is a Zimbabwean football player. He plays for Spanish club Zamora.

International career
He made his debut for Zimbabwe national football team on 29 March 2021 in a 2021 Africa Cup of Nations qualifier against Zambia.

References

External links
 
 

1998 births
Sportspeople from Harare
Living people
Zimbabwean footballers
Zimbabwe international footballers
Association football goalkeepers
Vélez CF players
Zamora CF footballers
Segunda División B players
Tercera División players
Zimbabwean expatriate footballers
Expatriate footballers in Spain
2021 Africa Cup of Nations players